The 1912 Illinois Fighting Illini football team was an American football team that represented the University of Illinois during the 1912 college football season.  In their seventh season under head coach Arthur R. Hall, the Illini compiled a 3–3–1 record and finished in sixth place in the Western Conference. Fullback/halfback William H. Woolston was the team captain.

Schedule

References

Illinois
Illinois Fighting Illini football seasons
Illinois Fighting Illini football